Huaguoyuan Tower 1 is a supertall skyscraper in Guiyang, Guizhou, China. Construction started in 2012 and was completed in 2020.

See also
Huaguoyuan Tower 2
List of tallest buildings in China

References

Skyscrapers in Guiyang
Buildings and structures under construction in China
Skyscraper office buildings in China